The Mercure was a 74-gun  ship of the line of the French Navy.

She took part in the Battle of the Nile under Captain Cambon. Damaged beyond repair and aground, she was burnt.

See also
 List of ships captured in the 18th century

References

 Demerliac, Cmdt. Alain, Nomenclature des navires français de 1774 a 1792.  Editions ANCRE, Nice.
 Winfield, Rif and Roberts, Stephen (2015) French Warships in the Age of Sail 1786-1861: Design, Construction, Careers and Fates. Seaforth Publishing. .

 

Ships of the line of the French Navy
Séduisant-class ships of the line
1783 ships
Captured ships
Ships built in France
Maritime incidents in 1798
Ship fires
Scuttled vessels
Shipwrecks of Egypt
Shipwrecks in the Mediterranean Sea